Bruce Zabriski (born August 3, 1957) is an American professional golfer who played on the PGA Tour, European Tour and the Nationwide Tour.

Zabriski joined the European Tour in 1985 and would play on the Tour until 1987. His best finish came at the Benson & Hedges International Open where he finished in a tie for 6th. He also recorded his best finish on the Order of Merit that year, finishing 103rd.

Zabriski joined the PGA Tour in 1988, earning his Tour card through qualifying school. He struggled in his rookie year and his best finish came at the Deposit Guaranty Golf Classic where he finished in a tie for twelfth, a career best. He played in five Nationwide Tour events in 1991 where he recorded three top-10 finishes including a win at the Ben Hogan Panama City Beach Classic. He rejoined the PGA Tour the following year, earning his card through qualifying school. In his second year on Tour he matched his career best finish on Tour at the United Airlines Hawaiian Open, finishing in a tie for twelfth.

Zabriski won the PGA Professional National Championship in 1997 and the PGA Assistant Professional Championship in 1995. He has won 22 events in the New York metropolitan area. Zabriski was named the National PGA Player of the Year a record five times (1991, 1994, 1996, 1997, 1998). He was also the number one ranked PGA club professional player three years in a row (1996-1998). He was also named the Metropolitan PGA Player of the Year five times (1989, 1991, 1993, 1996, 1997). He was also named to the PGA President's Council on Growing the Game in 2006.

Zabriski played in the Senior PGA Championship and the U.S. Senior Open in 2008 but missed the cut in both events.

Zabriski was named assistant golf professional at Winged Foot Golf Club in Mamaroneck, New York from 1993 to 1995 and then at Westchester Country Club in Harrison, New York from 1995 to 1997. He became the head professional at Trump International Golf Club in West Palm Beach, Florida in 1998 and then moved to the Old Palm Golf Club in Palm Beach Gardens, Florida in 2002 where he was the Director of Golf.

Professional wins (26)

Ben Hogan Tour wins (1)

Other wins (25)
1984 New York State Open
1985 Bacardi Classic, Long Island Open
1986 Bacardi Classic
1989 Nissan Classic, Dodge Open, Long Island Open
1990 Dodge Open, Long Island PGA Championship
1991 Long Island Open, Long Island PGA Championship
1993 Dodge Open, Long Island Open, Long Island PGA Championship, Metropolitan Open
1995 PGA Assistant Professional Championship, Westchester Open, Westchester PGA Championship
1996 Metropolitan Open, Metropolitan PGA Championship
1997 PGA Professional National Championship, Westchester Open
1998 Westchester Open
2007 Metropolitan Golf Association Senior Open Championship
2012 Metropolitan Golf Association PGA Senior Championship

Results in major championships

Note: Zabriski never played in the Masters Tournament.

CUT = missed the half-way cut
"T" = tied

U.S. national team appearances
PGA Cup: 1998 (winners), 2003 (winners)

See also
1987 PGA Tour Qualifying School graduates
1988 PGA Tour Qualifying School graduates
1991 PGA Tour Qualifying School graduates

References

External links

Profile on the Metropolitan Golf Association's official site

American male golfers
European Tour golfers
PGA Tour golfers
Golfers from New York (state)
People from Southampton (town), New York
1957 births
Living people